Rémy Marginet is a French rugby league footballer who plays as a  for Lézignan Sangliers in Elite One Championship. He is a French international.

Playing career
He has previously played for the Catalans Dragons, Featherstone Rovers, Newcastle Thunder and Palau Broncos and his home town club AS Saint Estève. Marginet was briefly signed by Hemel Stags, but the move did not happen and he never played for the Stags. He instead moved to the Sheffield Eagles, where he made nine appearances and scored three tries. After his spell in England, Marginet returned to his home country and former club the Palau Broncos.

He played for France in the 2014 European Cup. He finished as the tournament's top points scorer, scoring 5 tries and kicking 14 goals. He played for France again in 2015, representing them in a test match against England and in the 2015 European Cup tournament. He also traveled to Australia as part of the French squad for the 2017 World cup as a replacement for Guillaume Bonnet, he scored a two point goal kick in a 6-52 defeat by Australia.
Marginet made his debut for Newcastle Thunder on 27 May 2018 when playing against Workington Town in a game that they lost 38-18 but Marginet scored two tries himself.

References

External links

Remy Marginet Catalan profile on Sky Sports
2017 RLWC profile

1989 births
Living people
AS Saint Estève players
Catalans Dragons players
Featherstone Rovers players
France national rugby league team players
French rugby league players
Lézignan Sangliers players
Newcastle Thunder players
Palau Broncos players
Sportspeople from Pyrénées-Orientales
Rugby league halfbacks
Sheffield Eagles players
French expatriate sportspeople in England
Expatriate rugby league players in England
French expatriate rugby league players